Pultenaea capitellata, commonly known as hard-head bush-pea, is a species of flowering plant in the family Fabaceae and is endemic to south-eastern continental Australia. It is a sprawling to prostrate shrub with elliptic to broadly egg-shaped leaves, and yellow to orange flowers with a red to purple keel.

Description 
The edges of the leaves are turned down or rolled under and the lower surface is paler than the upper. The flowers are borne in dense clusters near the ends of branchlets with hairy, overlapping, three-lobed bracts.

Taxonomy and naming 
Pultenaea capitellata was first formally described in 1825 by Augustin Pyramus de Candolle in his Prodromus Systematis Naturalis Regni Vegetabilis from an unpublished description by Franz Sieber. The specific epithet (capitellata) means "a small head".

Distribution and habitat 
Hard-head bush-pea grows in swampy heath or in forest on the coast and tablelands south from the Kanangra-Boyd National Park in New South Wales to alpine areas of north-eastern Victoria.

References 

capitellata
Flora of New South Wales
Flora of the Australian Capital Territory
Flora of Victoria (Australia)
Taxa named by Augustin Pyramus de Candolle
Plants described in 1825